This is a listing of Australian rules footballers to have made their debut with a club for the Australian Football League season 2009.

List of players, sorted by club

Adelaide
Players making their AFL debuts
Myke Cook (Round 1)
Jared Petrenko (Round 1)
Taylor Walker (Round 1)
Shaun McKernan (Round 14)
Brodie Martin (Round 16)
Rory Sloane (Round 20)

Brisbane Lions
Players making their AFL debuts
Daniel Rich (Round 1)
Sam Sheldon (Round 6)
Matt Austin (Round 8)
Aaron Cornelius (Round 9)
Jack Redden (Round 15)
Tom Rockliff (Round 18)

Carlton
Players making their AFL debuts
Jeff Garlett (Round 1)
Sam Jacobs (Round 1)
Aaron Joseph (Round 1)
Mitch Robinson (Round 1)
Chris Yarran (Round 7)
Players from other clubs
Chris Johnson (Round 1) – previously played for Melbourne
Greg Bentley (Round 6) – previously played for Port Adelaide

Collingwood
Players making their AFL debuts
Dayne Beams (Round 2)
Brent Macaffer (Round 5)
Steele Sidebottom (Round 7)
Players from other clubs
Leigh Brown (Round 2) – previously played for Fremantle and North Melbourne
Anthony Corrie (Round 6) – previously played for Brisbane

Essendon
Players making their AFL debuts
Michael Hurley (Round 1)
David Zaharakis (Round 2)
Michael Quinn (Round 2)
Players from other clubs
Hayden Skipworth (Round 1) – previously played for Adelaide
Brent Prismall (Round 11) – previously played for Geelong

Fremantle
Players making their AFL debuts
Stephen Hill (Round 1)
Nick Suban (Round 1)
Greg Broughton (Round 3)
Matt de Boer (Round 6)
Luke Pratt (Round 7)
Clancee Pearce (Round 11)
Michael Walters (Round 11)
Hayden Ballantyne (Round 13)
Zac Clarke (Round 13)
Tim Ruffles (Round 14)
Jay van Berlo (Round 17)

Geelong
Players making their AFL debuts
Simon Hogan (Round 2)
Nathan Djerrkura (Round 10)
Tom Gillies (Round 15)
Jeremy Laidler (Round 15)

Hawthorn
Players making their AFL debuts
Ryan Schoenmakers (Round 1)
Brendan Whitecross (Round 1)
Matt Suckling (Round 1)
Beau Muston (Round 9)
Liam Shiels (Round 10)
Shane Savage (Round 20)
Riley Milne (Round 21)

Melbourne
Players making their AFL debuts
Kyle Cheney (Round 1)
Neville Jetta (Round 1)
Jamie Bennell (Round 1)
Jake Spencer (Round 1)
Jack Watts (Round 11)
Liam Jurrah (Round 12)
Jordie McKenzie (Round 17)
Rohan Bail (Round 19)
Tom McNamara (Round 19)
Players from other clubs
John Meesen (Round 3) – previously played for Adelaide

North Melbourne
Players making their AFL debuts
Jack Ziebell (Round 1)
Ben Warren (Round 4)
Levi Greenwood (Round 5)
Sam Wright (Round 8)
Nathan Grima (Round 8)
Cruize Garlett (Round 12)
Liam Anthony (Round 13)

Port Adelaide
Players making their AFL debuts
Wade Thompson (Round 3)
Hamish Hartlett (Round 4)
Jason Davenport (Round 7)
Matthew Broadbent (Round 16)
Players from other clubs
Danny Meyer (Round 12) – previously played for Richmond

Richmond
Players making their AFL debuts
Andrew Browne (Round 1)
Robin Nahas (Round 2)
Alex Rance (Round 2)
Andrew Collins (Round 4)
Ty Vickery (Round 12)
Jarrod Silvester (Round 13)
Jayden Post (Round 14)
Players from other clubs
Ben Cousins (Round 1) – previously played for West Coast
Tom Hislop (Round 2) – previously played for Essendon

St Kilda
Players from other clubs
Zac Dawson (Round 1) – previously played for Hawthorn
Farren Ray (Round 1) – previously played for Western Bulldogs

Sydney Swans
Players making their AFL debuts
Brett Meredith (Round 2)
Kristin Thornton (Round 4)
Mike Pyke (Round 6) – previously played for Canada national rugby union team
Dan Hannebery (Round 16)
Players from other clubs
Rhyce Shaw (Round 1) – previously played for Collingwood

West Coast Eagles
Players making their AFL debuts
Adam Cockie (Round 6)
Tom Swift (Round 10)
Nic Naitanui (Round 12)
Patrick McGinnity (Round 15)

Western Bulldogs
Players making their AFL debuts
Liam Picken (Round 2) 
Jarrad Grant (Round 5)
Brennan Stack (Round 11)
Easton Wood (Round 19)

Australian rules football records and statistics
Australian rules football-related lists
2009 in Australian rules football
2009 Australian Football League season